Helen Caroline Bentwich  ( Franklin; 6 January 1892 – 26 April 1972) was a British philanthropist and politician.

Biography
Helen Franklin (later Bentwich) was born in Notting Hill, London, into a prominent Jewish family. Her father, Arthur Ellis Franklin, was a merchant banker and her uncles Herbert and Stuart Samuel were leading politicians. Her siblings included Hugh Franklin, a suffragist, and Ellis Arthur Franklin, another banker and eventual vice-principal of the Working Men's College. 

She attended St Paul's Girls' School and Bedford College. Her niece, Rosalind Franklin, established in 1952 that DNA consisted of a double helix.

Philanthropy
Bentwich served a forewoman at the Woolwich Arsenal in 1916. She fought for the rights of women workers and tried to form a trade union. Forced to resign, she became an organiser for the Women's Land Army.

Bentwich and her husband moved to Palestine in 1919, where he was appointed attorney-general under the British Mandate. She organised nursery schools, formed arts and crafts centres, and became honorary secretary of the Palestine Council of Jewish Women. She had mixed feelings about later developments in the region:

Her nephew, lawyer Benedict Birnberg, wrote a letter to The Guardian that she "never acquired a handle and always cold-shouldered Zionism."

In the 1930s she was active in the Movement for the Care of Children from Germany, and was later involved in helping the Falashas in Ethiopia.

Political career
Soon after her arrival, Helen joined the Labour Party and ran for Parliament at a by-election in Dulwich (1932) and in Harrow in the 1935 general election, but lost both times. However, in the spring of 1934 she was invited by Eveline Lowe to become a co-opted member of the London County Council education committee, and in 1937 she was elected a member of the Council for North Kensington. 

In 1946, she was elected for Bethnal Green North East and from 1955 to 1965 she was a member for Stoke Newington and Hackney North. She became chairman of the education committee in 1947, alderman in 1949, vice-chair in 1950, and Chairman of the Council from 1956 to 1957. In 1965 she was appointed CBE.

Personal life
She married barrister Norman Bentwich in 1915. She followed him in Cairo, Egypt shortly after their wedding. In 1931, the couple returned to England. They had homes in Hampstead and Sandwich, Kent, as well as a home in Jerusalem, where her husband was a Hebrew University professor.

Death and legacy
Bentwich died at her home in Hampstead, London, in 1972, a year after her husband.

The archives of Helen Bentwich are held at The Women's Library at the Library of the London School of Economics.

Bibliography
 Our Councils: The Story of Local Government (Routledge and Kegan Paul, London 1962)
 Mandate Memories, 1918 – 1948 (with Norman Bentwich, Hogarth Press, 1965)
 The Vale of Health on Hampstead Heath, 1777–1967 (High Hill Press, Hampstead, 1968)
 History of Sandwich in Kent (T. F. Pain and Sons, Deal, 1971)
 If I forget thee: some chapters of autobiography, 1912–20 (Elek, London, 1973)
 Tidings from Zion: Helen Bentwich's letters from Jerusalem, 1919–1931 (edited by Jenifer Glynn; I.B. Tauris, London, 2000).

References

External links 
 Portrait of Helen Bentwich in 1957

1892 births
1972 deaths
20th-century English women politicians
20th-century English politicians
20th-century British philanthropists
20th-century English Jews
20th-century English memoirists
20th-century English women writers
Alumni of Bedford College, London
Commanders of the Order of the British Empire
English autobiographers
English Jews
English local historians
English women philanthropists
English people of Israeli descent
Franklin family (Anglo-Jewish)
Historians of London
Labour Party (UK) councillors
Members of London County Council
People from Hampstead
People from Jerusalem
People from Sandwich, Kent
People from Notting Hill
Women's Land Army members (World War I)
Women councillors in England
20th-century women philanthropists